Sweep is a British puppet and television character popular in the United Kingdom, United States, Canada, Australia, Ireland, New Zealand and other countries.

Sweep is a grey glove puppet dog with long black ears who joined The Sooty Show in 1957, as a friend to fellow puppet Sooty.  He is a dim-witted dog with a penchant for bones and sausages. Sweep is notable for his method of communication which consists of a loud high-pitched squeak that gains its inflection from normal speech and its rhythm from the syllables in each word.

The rest of the cast, namely Soo and the presenter, could understand Sweep perfectly, and would (albeit indirectly) translate for the viewer. The sound of Sweep's voice was achieved using a saxophone reed.  Versions of the puppet later sold as toys had an integral squeaker connected to an air bulb that was squeezed by hand.

Sweep's family first appeared on the Sooty Show in an episode called Sweep's Family. He has his mother and father, a twin brother Swoop, two cousins Swipe and Swap and another seven brothers in the litter (all of whom look exactly like him, except that they each wear different coloured collars to tell each other apart). However Swipe and Swap are stated to be Sweep's brothers in the Sooty & Co. episode Sweep's Family and the Sooty Heights episode the Hounds of Music.

Voice actors

 Leslie Corbett - The Sooty Show
 Brian Sandford - The Sooty Show, Sooty & Co., Sooty Heights, Sooty
 Rob Rackstraw - Sooty's Amazing Adventures
 Francis Wright - Sooty

References 

Television characters introduced in 1957
Fictional dogs
British comedy puppets
Sooty